(born Fukuoka, 13 March 1970) is a Japanese former rugby union player. He played as flanker.

Career
At club level, Ishi played throughout all of his career for Toyota Verblitz until his retirement. His only cap for Japan was against Spain, in Tokyo, on 20 August 1999. He was called up to play in the 1999 Rugby World Cup squad, but he never played any match in the tournament. Between 2004 and 2010, Ishi was appointed as manager for Toyota Verblitz.

Notes

External links

1970 births
Living people
Rugby union flankers
Japanese rugby union players
Toyota Verblitz players
People from Fukuoka
Japan international rugby union players